Feliks Gross (June 17, 1906 in Kraków - November 9, 2006 in New York City) was a Polish-American sociologist.

Before World War II, he became a lecturer at the Jagiellonian University in Kraków, Poland. During the war, he escaped to USA, where he would hold many positions in academia, including a professorship at Graduate Centre and Brooklyn College in City University of New York and at the University of Wyoming.

Gross wrote more than 20 books and uncounted articles published in many languages.

The Feliks Gross Endowment Award was established at CUNY in his memory. This award is given annually to one to two assistant professors in recognition of outstanding research in the humanities or sciences.

Selected works
 Citizenship and Ethnicity 1999
 Ethnics in a Borderland 1978
 Violence in Politics 1972
 Federacje i konfederacje europejskie: rodowód i wizje 1994
 Foreign policy analysis 1954
 Ideologies, Goals, and Values 1985
 Proletariat i kultura: warunki społeczne i gospodarcze kultury proletariatu  1938
 The Civic and the Tribal State 1998
 The Revolutionary Party 1974
 The seizure of political power in a century of revolutions 1958
 Tolerancja i pluralizm 1992
 Wartości, nauka i świadectwa epoki 2002
 Wspomnienie o Adamie Ciołkoszu 1987
 Koczownictwo 1936

Footnotes

References
 Jerome Krase, Professor Feliks Gross: Sociological Humanist, ASA Footnotes, 2006
  Halina Jensen, Feliks Gross – uczony, dzialacz, publicysta , "Kurier Plus", 1999
  Halina Niedzielska, Z ducha oświecenia, "Przegląd Polski On-Line", 16.06.2006 r.
 FELIKS GROSS (1906-2006)

1906 births
2006 deaths
Academic staff of Jagiellonian University
Polish emigrants to the United States
City University of New York faculty
University of Wyoming faculty
Polish centenarians
Men centenarians
Polish sociologists
Brooklyn College faculty